Wilhelmus Beurs (1656–1700) was a Dutch Golden Age painter.

Biography
Beurs was born in Dordrecht. According to Houbraken, he was the son of a shoemaker and a quick study who was able to produce a good landscape after only a year's instruction, though he later took up flower painting. Houbraken met him as a fellow pupil of Willem van Drielenburg in 1671.
Houbraken praised his book and reprinted one page of it as an example.

According to the RKD he moved to Amsterdam in 1672 where he later married. In 1687 he moved to Zwolle, where from 1688 he gave painting lessons from his studio and where he wrote a book on the art of painting that was published in 1692. He dedicated his book to his four pupils Aleida Greve, Anna Cornelia Holt, Sophia Holt, and Cornelia van Marle.
He is known for Italianate landscapes; still-life paintings are documented in archives but no longer known. He died in Zwolle in 1700.

References

 Wilhelmus Beurs 1692 on the Google Books Library Project

1656 births
1700 deaths
Dutch Golden Age painters
Dutch male painters
Artists from Dordrecht
Flower artists